Sovinj, also rendered as Sovich, may refer to:
 Sovinj-e Olya
 Sovinj-e Sofla